The Three Sisters are the three main agricultural crops of various Indigenous peoples of North America: squash, maize ("corn"), and climbing beans (typically tepary beans or common beans). 
In a technique known as companion planting, the maize and beans are often planted together in mounds formed by hilling soil around the base of the plants each year; squash is typically planted between the mounds. The cornstalk serves as a trellis for climbing beans, the beans fix nitrogen in their root nodules and stabilize the maize in high winds, and the wide leaves of the squash plant shade the ground, keeping the soil moist and helping prevent the establishment of weeds.

Indigenous peoples throughout North America cultivated different varieties of the Three Sisters, adapted to varying local environments.
The individual crops and their use in polyculture originated in Mesoamerica; where squash was domesticated first, followed by maize and then beans, over a period of 5,000–6,500 years.
European records from the sixteenth century describe highly productive Indigenous agriculture based on cultivation of the Three Sisters throughout what are now the Eastern United States and Canada, where the crops were used for both food and trade.
Geographer Carl O. Sauer described the Three Sisters as "a symbiotic plant complex of North and Central America without an equal elsewhere".

Cultivation methods

Agricultural history in the Americas took a different path from the Old World as the Americas lacked large-seeded, easily domesticated grains (such as wheat and barley) and large domesticated animals that could be used for agricultural labor. At the time of first contact between the Europeans and the Americans, Carlos Sempat Assadourian writes that Europeans practiced "extensive agriculture, based on the plough and draught animals" while the Indigenous peoples of the Americas practiced "intensive agriculture, based on human labour".

In Indigenous American companion planting, maize (Zea mays), beans (Phaseolus and Vicia spp.), and squash (Cucurbita pepo) are planted close together. The maize and beans are often planted together in mounds formed by hilling soil around the base of the plants each year; squash is typically planted between the mounds.
In the northeastern U.S., this practice increases soil temperature in the mound and improves drainage, both of which benefit maize planted in spring. 
In Haudenosaunee (Iroquois) farming, the fields were not tilled, enhancing soil fertility and the sustainability of the cropping system by limiting soil erosion and oxidation of soil organic matter.

The three crops benefit by being grown together.
The cornstalk serves as a trellis for the beans to climb, the beans fix nitrogen in the soil, and their twining vines stabilize the maize in high winds, and the wide leaves of the squash plant shade the ground, keeping the soil moist and helping prevent the establishment of weeds.
The prickly hairs of some squash varieties also deter pests, such as deer and raccoons.

Although this synergy had been traditionally reputed among American cultures, scientific confirmation has arrived only much more recently.
Dzubenko & Petrenko 1971, Lykhvar & Nazarova 1970 and Pronin et al. 1970 find a wide number of leguminous crops increase the growth and yield of maize, while Gulyaev et al. 1970 select later maturing lines of beans to produce the converse effect, increasing even further the yield gain of beans when planted with maize.
Pronin et al. 1972 find increased productivity and root exudate in both crops when combining Vicia faba with maize, and even more so in soils with preexisting high nitrogen fixing microorganism activity.

Indigenous peoples throughout North America cultivated different varieties of the Three Sisters, adapted to varying local environments.
The milpas of Mesoamerica are farms or gardens that employ companion planting on a larger scale.
The Ancestral Puebloans adopted this garden design in the drier deserts and xeric shrublands environment. The Tewa and other peoples of the North American Southwest often included a "fourth Sister", Rocky Mountain bee plant (Cleome serrulata), which attracts bees to help pollinate the beans and squash.
The Three Sisters crop model was widely used by a number of First Nations in the Great Lakes–St. Lawrence Lowlands region.

Productivity 
European records from the sixteenth century describe highly productive Indigenous agriculture based on cultivation of the Three Sisters throughout what are now the Eastern United States and Canada, from Florida to Ontario. 
Geographer Carl O. Sauer described the Three Sisters as "a symbiotic plant complex of North and Central America without an equal elsewhere".
Agronomist Jane Mt. Pleasant writes that the Three Sisters mound system "enhances the soil physical and biochemical environment, minimizes soil erosion, improves soil tilth, manages plant population and spacing, provides for plant nutrients in appropriate quantities, and at the time needed, and controls weeds".
After several thousand years of selective breeding, the hemisphere's most important crop, maize, was more productive than Old World grain crops. Maize produced two and one-half times more calories per acre than wheat and barley.

Nutritionally, maize, beans, and squash contain all nine essential amino acids, as well as complex carbohydrates and essential fatty acids.
The protein from maize is further enhanced by protein contributions from beans and pumpkin seeds, while pumpkin flesh provides large amounts of vitamin A; with the Three Sisters, farmers harvest about the same amount of energy as from maize monoculture, but get more protein yield from the inter-planted bean and pumpkin. 
Mt. Pleasant writes that this largely explains the value of the Three Sisters over monoculture cropping, as the system yields large amounts of energy, and at the same time increases protein yields; this polyculture cropping system yielded more food and supported more people per hectare compared to monocultures of the individual crops or mixtures of monocultures.

Yields

Scholars Mt. Pleasant and Burt reproduced Iroquoian methods of cultivation with Iroquoian varieties of maize at several locations in New York. They reported yields of 22 to 76 bushels of maize (550 to 1,930 kg) per acre. Soil fertility and weather were the main determinants of yield. Mt. Pleasant also questioned the conventional wisdom that the Iroquois practiced slash-and-burn agriculture, abandoning fields when the soil was depleted of nutrients after several years of farming, but instead claimed that Iroquoian no-till farming techniques preserved soil fertility. In a similar experiment to reproduce Native American agricultural practices in Minnesota, Munson-Scullin and Scullin reported maize yields of 40 bushels (1,100 kg) in the first year a field was cultivated declining to 30 bushels (820 kg) the second year, and 25 bushels (550 kg) the third year. (For comparative purposes, average yield of maize per acre in New York in 2021 using modern techniques and growing hybrid maize was 167 bushels per acre.)

Other scholars have estimated lower average yields of maize. Hart and Feranec estimated the yield of Huron agriculture at 8 to 22 bushels (200 to 560 kg) per acre, the higher yields coming from newly-cultivated land. The Huron lived in Ontario near the northern limit of where agriculture was feasible and had less fertile soils than many other regions. Nevertheless, they produced surpluses for trading with nearby non-agricultural peoples. Sissel Schroeder estimates that the average yield of Native American farms in the 19th century was 18.9 bushels per acre (480 kg), but opines that pre-historic yields might have been as low as 10 bushels per acre (255 kg).

As the Iroquois and other Native Americans did not plow their land, Mt. Pleasant and Burt concluded that their lands retained more organic matter and thus were higher in yields of maize than early Euro-American farms in North America.

Society and culture
Maize, beans, and squash, whether grown individually or together, have a very long history in the Americas. 
The process to develop this agricultural knowledge took place over 5,000–6,500 years. Squash was domesticated first, with maize second and beans third.
Squash was first domesticated 8,000–10,000 years ago.

Cahokian, Mississippian and Muscogee culture 

Corn, squash and beans were planted ca. 800 AD in the largest Native American city north of the Rio Grande known as Cahokia, in the present US state of Illinois, across the Mississippi River from St. Louis, Missouri.
The Three Sisters crops were responsible for the surplus food that created an expanded population throughout the extended Mississippi River System, creating the Mississippian and Muscogee cultures that flourished from ca. 800 AD to ca. 1600, when physical contact with Spanish explorers brought Eurasian diseases, death, and cultural collapse.

Haudenosaunee culture 

In the Handbook of North American Indians, the Three Sisters are called the "foundation of (Iroquois) subsistence", allowing the Haudenosaunee or Iroquois to develop the institutions of sedentary life.
The Three Sisters appear prominently in Haudenosaunee oral traditions and ceremonies, such as the creation story and the thanksgiving address. 
Researchers in the early 20th century described more than a dozen varieties of maize and similar numbers of bean varieties, as well as many types of squash, such as pumpkin and winter squash, grown in Haudenosaunee communities. The first academic description of the Three Sisters cropping system in 1910 reported that the Iroquois preferred to plant the three crops together, since it took less time and effort than planting them individually, and because they believed the plants were "guarded by three inseparable spirits and would not thrive apart". 

Among the Haudenosaunee, women were responsible for cultivation and distribution of the three crops, which raised their social status. Male roles traditionally included extended periods of travel, such as for hunting expeditions, diplomatic missions, or military raids. Men took part in the initial preparation for the planting of the Three Sisters by clearing the planting ground, after which groups of related women, working communally, performed the planting, weeding, and harvesting.
Based on archaeological findings, paleobotanist John Hart concludes that the Haudenosaunee began growing the three crops as a polyculture sometime after 700 BP. 
The Haudenosaunee frequently traded their crops, so the need for each crop could vary substantially from year to year. Jane Mt. Pleasant surmises that the Haudenosaunee may have typically inter-planted the three crops, but they could also have planted monocultures of the individual crops to meet specific needs.

Maya culture 

The Maya diet focused on three domesticated staple crops: maize, squash, and beans (typically Phaseolus vulgaris).
Among the three, maize was the central component of the diet of the ancient Maya and figured prominently in Maya mythology and ideology. Archaeological evidence suggests that Chapalote-Nal-Tel was the dominant maize species, though it is likely others were being exploited also.
Maize was used and eaten in a variety of ways, but was always nixtamalized.

See also

 Agriculture in the prehistoric Southwest
 Agroforestry
 Crop rotation
 Eastern Agricultural Complex
 Intercropping
 Mesoamerican agriculture
 Multiple cropping
 No-till farming
 Southern New England Algonquian cuisine

References

Further reading
 
 
 
 
 
 
 

Crops originating from the United States
Indigenous cuisine in Canada
History of agriculture in the United States
Organic gardening
Permaculture
Early agriculture in Mesoamerica
Seneca people
Iroquois
Maize